Bhupalendra Malla was a Malla ruler and the eleventh king of Kantipur. He succeeded his father Parthibendra Malla in 1687 as the King of Kantipur.

Reign 
Bhupalendra Malla was just eight years old when he ascended the throne. His mother Riddhilakshmi acted as the regent. A minister named Lakshminarayan rose to the power of Chief Minister and supreme authority in the realm and even inscribed his name on the coins issued by Bhupalendra Malla. Lakshminarayan assassinated Chikuti, a prominent minister during the reign of Parthibendra Malla, and other significant nobles. Lakshminarayan was assassinated in 1690 following a rumor of illicit relationship with the regent, Riddhilkakshmi.

Bhupalendra Malla's relationship with his mother gradually worsened and he soon started undertaking the administration. He was fond of military activity but never had any significant battles with the neighboring kingdoms. 

He died in 1700 at the age of 21 during his pilgrimage in Ayodhya and was succeeded by his son Bhaskara Malla..

References 

Malla rulers of Kantipur
17th-century Nepalese people
Nepalese monarchs
1700 deaths